Predator 2 is a 1990 American science fiction action film written by brothers Jim and John Thomas, directed by Stephen Hopkins, and starring Danny Glover, Gary Busey, Ruben Blades, María Conchita Alonso, Bill Paxton, and Kevin Peter Hall. It is the second installment of the Predator franchise, serving as a sequel to 1987's Predator, with Kevin Peter Hall reprising the title role of the Predator. Set ten years after the events of the first film, in Los Angeles, the film focuses on the Predator, a technologically advanced extraterrestrial hunter, and the efforts of a disgruntled police officer and his allies to defeat the malevolent creature.

At the time of release, the film received generally negative reviews and earned a moderate return at the box office, grossing $57 million worldwide, compared to the previous film's $98 million gross on a smaller production budget. The film has been viewed more positively over time, especially for Danny Glover's performance, the direction, and the musical score, and has gained a cult following. This would be the last film appearance of the Predator until 2004's crossover film Alien vs. Predator, followed in 2007 by Aliens vs. Predator: Requiem. A third film, Predators, was released in 2010, a fourth film, The Predator in 2018, and a prequel, Prey, in 2022.

Plot
In 1997, Los Angeles is suffering from both a heat wave and a turf war between heavily armed Colombian and Jamaican drug cartels. A Predator watches a shootout between the police, Jamaicans, and Colombians, observing as Lieutenant Michael R. Harrigan charges into the firefight to rescue two wounded officers and drive the Colombians back into their hideout. The Predator assaults the Colombians, causing a disturbance that prompts Harrigan and detectives Leona Cantrell and Danny Archuleta to defy orders and enter the hideout, where they find the slaughtered Colombians. On the roof, Harrigan shoots the crazed gang leader and catches a glimpse of the camouflaged Predator, but dismisses it as a consequence of the extreme heat and his acrophobia. At the station, Harrigan is reprimanded by his superiors for his disobedience and introduced to Special Agent Peter Keyes, leader of a task force investigating the cartels, and Detective Jerry Lambert, the newest member of Harrigan's team.

Later that evening, Jamaicans invade the Colombian drug lord's penthouse and murder him before they are murdered in turn by the Predator. Upon their arrival, Harrigan's team notes the similarities between the current crime scene and the earlier Colombian massacre until Keyes' team arrives and removes them. Archuleta returns to conduct a solo investigation, finding one of the Predator's spear tips before the creature kills him. As an enraged Harrigan vows to stop Archuleta's killer, forensic analysis reveals the spear tip is not composed of any known element on the periodic table. Seeking answers, Harrigan meets with Jamaican drug lord King Willie, a voodoo practitioner who believes the killer is supernatural and that he should prepare himself for battle against it. Harrigan leaves before the Predator kills King Willie, taking his head as a trophy. Tracing a lead indicating Archuleta's killer had recently been in a slaughterhouse, Harrigan arranges to meet his team at the warehouse district to investigate.

Cantrell and Lambert take the subway there, but are ambushed by the Predator, who kills Lambert and numerous armed passengers but spares Cantrell after its helmet's scanners indicate that she is pregnant. Arriving in time to see it claim Lambert’s head, Harrigan chases the fleeing Predator, but is intercepted by Keyes' men. Keyes reveals that the monster is an extraterrestrial hunter with infrared vision and active camouflage that has been hunting humans for sport throughout several armed conflicts, with the most recent being a decade prior in Central America. Keyes and his team have set a trap in a nearby slaughterhouse, using thermally insulated suits with mounted ultraviolet lights and cryogenic weapons to capture it for study. Upon arrival, the suspicious Predator uses its scanners to track, outmaneuver, and slaughter Keyes' men via their lights.

Harrigan attacks and wounds the Predator, but it destroys his weapon. It nearly kills him before Keyes tries to freeze the creature, only to be bisected by the Predator's Smart Disc. The Predator chases Harrigan to the roof, where they clash until they are left hanging from a ledge. The creature activates a self-destruct device on its forearm, which Harrigan severs with the disc, disarming it while the Predator falls through an apartment, where it treats its wounds and flees. Harrigan pursues it to a spacecraft hidden underground and eventually kills the Predator with its disc. A group of Predators emerge to collect their dead comrade and give Harrigan an antique flintlock pistol as a trophy. As the ship takes off, Harrigan escapes to the surface and meets with the remainder of Keyes' team. As Keyes' subordinate Garber curses their lost opportunity to capture the creature, Harrigan privately muses that the beings will return.

Cast

 Danny Glover as Lieutenant Mike Harrigan, an LAPD Officer who is investigating rival Jamaican and Colombian drug cartels. He is stubborn and often is criticized by the superior officers for not obeying orders.
 Kevin Peter Hall as City Hunter / The Predator, a member of an alien warrior race that hunts aggressive members of other species for sport, uses active camouflage and a plasma weapon, and can see in the infrared spectrum. Hall also played the Elder Predator, the leader of the Predators at the end of the film.
 Hal Rayle provides the voice of the Predator, replacing Peter Cullen from the first film.
 Gary Busey as Special Agent Peter Keyes, posed as a DEA agent leading a special task force investigating a drug conspiracy as a cover for his attempts to capture the Predator. The character is a replacement for "Dutch," the protagonist of the first film, after Arnold Schwarzenegger declined to reprise the role. 
 Rubén Blades as Detective Danny Archuleta, a member of Harrigan's team and a long-time friend of his.
 María Conchita Alonso as Detective Leona Cantrell, an LAPD cop involved in the Jamaican-Colombian gang wars
 Bill Paxton as Detective Jerry Lambert, an LAPD cop, transferred from another precinct into Metro Command. His role is often that of comic relief.
 Lilyan Chauvin as Dr. Irene Edwards, the chief medical examiner and forensic pathologist of Los Angeles.  She aids Harrigan, in spite of being completely cut out of the official investigation by Keyes' team.
 Robert Davi as Deputy Chief Phil Heinemann.
 Adam Baldwin as Agent Adam Garber, a member of Keyes' task force.
 Kent McCord as Captain Brent Pilgrim, an LAPD cop, and Harrigan's immediate boss.
 Steve Kahan as Sergeant Neil Reeger, an LAPD SWAT Sergeant.
 Henry Kingi as "El Scorpio", a violent member of the Colombian Scorpions. Kingi previously appeared in the first film as an insurgent pursued by Dutch Schaefer.
 Morton Downey Jr. as Tony Pope, a journalist who reports the gruesome and murderous homicides left by the Predator. He is constantly criticized by the police for interfering with investigations.
 Calvin Lockhart as Willie "King Willie", the boss of the Jamaica Voodoo Posse. He appears to be psychic because of his voodoo beliefs.
 Sylvia Kauders as Ruth Albright, an elderly lady.
 Billy "Sly" Williams as Jackson, a paramedic.
 Jsu Garcia (Credited as Nick Corri) as Dvorkin, an LAPD detective.
 Michael Wiseman as Zinck, an LAPD officer.
 Teri Weigel as Mary, Ramon Vega's Colombian mistress.
 Thomas Rosales Jr. as El Scorpio Gang Member
 Michael Papajohn as Gang member in the subway.
 Casey Sander as an OWLFP Member
 Pat Skipper as an OWLFP Member
 Jim Ishida as A Reporter
Elpidia Carrillo reprises her role as Anna Gonsalves from the first film in a cameo appearance. She is seen aiding government agents in a videotape, showing the devastating after-effects of the first Predator's self-destruct device to the U.S. Army. Carrillo filmed an additional scene in which she talks to the camera and describes the events of the first film, but this scene was cut.

Production
Once 20th Century Fox approached Predator screenwriters Jim and John Thomas to write a sequel, they pitched six ideas, one of which was "putting the creature in an urban jungle", which the studio liked. The eventual setting was Los Angeles, portrayed as a city blighted by gang warfare in the midst of a severe heat wave, creating the ideal "hot spot" in which the Predator would search for hunting targets. The script was then developed in just three weeks. A goal of the sequel would be to expand on the Predator's origins and motives, showing the creature has been visiting the planet for centuries, is not psychopathic, but just interested in hunting, and depicting its spacecraft on screen.

Producer Joel Silver invited director Stephen Hopkins, who drew his interest while directing A Nightmare on Elm Street 5: The Dream Child. As Hopkins joined production before the screenplay was finished, he worked closely with the Thomases in the script revisions and storyboarding the sequences they had written. For the lead role of LAPD police officer Harrigan, Hopkins had originally envisioned Patrick Swayze playing the role, teaming up with a returning Arnold Schwarzenegger, who starred as Dutch in the first film. Hopkins also met with Steven Seagal for the role; although the actor was interested in starring in the film and had his own ideas about the character, wanting to portray him as a CIA psychiatrist and martial arts expert, Hopkins ultimately decided against it, as he wanted the character to be an Average Joe type. Due to a dispute over salary, Schwarzenegger declined to return to the sequel, and Silver ultimately brought in three actors he had worked with in Lethal Weapon: Gary Busey, Steve Kahan, and Danny Glover, who would end up playing the role of Harrigan. Production was split between location shooting, mostly at night, and soundstage filming.

The main Predator was designed to look more urban and hip than its predecessor. Design changes included tribal ornamentation on the forehead, which was made steeper and shallower, brighter skin coloration, and a greater number of fangs.  Describing the new Predator's design, Stan Winston said, "Broad concept's the same. The difference is, this is a different individual. A different individual of the same species. As in a snake is a snake, but different snakes are different. Their colorings are different, different parts of their characteristics, their facial structures, subtle differences." Production designer Lawrence Paull said that with the Predator ship, he attempted "a space vehicle unlike anything that had ever been designed before", a snail-shaped vessel whose interior was "both technological and reptilian, where the creature and its ship blend and work together". Given the Alien franchise was also by Fox and featured effects work by Winston, the crew decided to add an Alien head among the trophy skulls in the Predator ship.

The writers decided to set Predator 2 ten years after the original, which was the then-future of 1997, leading to some developments like new video technology and a then-nonexistent subway in Los Angeles (the Los Angeles Metro Rail started operating the same year the film hit theaters). For the set design, Paul aimed for a "kind of retrograde future that's equal parts Brazil and Blade Runner mixed in with modern-day technology", with "big and outrageous" structures but simpler prop design, such as boxy and colorless cars.

The MPAA initially gave Predator 2 an NC-17 rating, so several cuts were made to bring it down to an R rating.

A short unofficial music video was made towards the end of filming; Danny Glover can be seen dancing with the Predator and others.

Music

Alan Silvestri returned to score the sequel, conducting the Skywalker Symphony Orchestra. Whereas the first film did not have its music released until years later, a soundtrack album for the sequel was issued on December 11, 1990, from Varèse Sarabande. On December 1, 2014, the label issued Predator 2: The Deluxe Edition.

Release

Home media
Predator 2 was released on VHS and LaserDisc in 1991, on DVD in 2003, a two-disc special edition in January 2005, and on Blu-ray on June 9, 2009, in North America. The film was released on 4K UHD Blu-Ray on August 7, 2018.

Reception

Box office
Released on November 21, 1990, Predator 2 was #4 at the US box office in its opening weekend, with a gross of over $8 million behind the films Dances with Wolves, Three Men and a Little Lady, Rocky V, and Twentieth Century Fox's own film Home Alone. The film grossed a total of $57 million, $30 million of which was from the United States. The worldwide box office revenue totaled $57,120,318 in ticket sales. The film became the lowest-grossing film in the Predator franchise.

Critical response

In 1990, the film's reviews were generally negative, though reviewers were generally impressed by the casting of Danny Glover as an action hero. On review aggregation website Rotten Tomatoes, the film received an approval rating of 31% based on 35 reviews, with an average rating of 5/10. The site's consensus states: "The thrill of the hunt is gone in this hackneyed sequel." On Metacritic, the film has a weighted average score of 46 out of 100 based on 18 critics, indicating "mixed or average reviews". Audiences polled by CinemaScore gave the film an average grade of "B+" on an A+ to F scale.

The reviewers for The Washington Post were split: Rita Kempley enjoyed the film, saying she felt that it had "the dismal irony of RoboCop and the brooding fatalism of Blade Runner", and felt Glover "brings an unusual depth to the action-adventure and proves fiercely effective as the Predator's new nemesis." Desson Howe felt the film was "blithely unoriginal" and numbingly violent, but also praised Glover's ability to bring warmth to the center of a cold film.

In her review for The New York Times, Janet Maslin called the film "an unbeatable contender" for the "most mindless, mean-spirited action film of the holiday season". Chicago Sun-Times critic Roger Ebert, in giving the film two out of four stars, suggested that it represents an "angry and ugly" dream. He also felt that the creatures' design had racist undertones where "subliminal clues [...] encourage us to subconsciously connect the menace with black males."

Several retrospective reviews have considered the film underrated, and it has gained a cult following.

Later director Stephen Hopkins said:"It’s so over the top. I just sort of went for it and made the biggest, boldest, loudest movie I could make. I was only 29 years old – I was like a rampant child, running around Los Angeles, blowing the shit out of everything and making things as bloody as possible." About the modest reception at the box office and the cult status since its release, he added "It had a big initial opening weekend if I remember correctly – but I think many people were disappointed that Arnold wasn’t in it. A lot of people like the film and some prefer it to the original – just because it’s in a city and more contemporary."

Danny Glover was also proud of his performance, saying:
I have two films I’ve done that I feel that I was bigger than life in, in which I felt that I could control the space. Silverado for me, and Predator 2. In Predator 2, it was like ‘who’s the baddest cat in your space, and the baddest cat says ‘I’m gonna challenge you.’ Mano y mano. I was the baddest guy in his space. What happens? I kill him, and then the others come around, and I’m like ‘alright... who’s next?’ I was about 42, 43.. in the best shape in my life, best shape I’ve been in. I was running on the beach, had my training, I was lifting weights a lot more than I am now. I was really feeling it in that movie.

Other media

Sequels

A third main film titled Predators was released in 2010, and a fourth, The Predator, in 2018.

Prequel

A prequel titled Prey, which takes place in 1719, was released in 2022.

Novelization
A novelization of the film written by Simon Hawke was released on December 1, 1990, by the publishing company Jove. The novelization provided a small amount of information regarding the fate of "Dutch" from the first film. Keyes recalls memories of speaking with the battered Major while infirmed in a hospital, suffering from radiation sickness. "Dutch" is said to have escaped from the hospital, never to be seen again. Furthermore, the novel tells a great deal of the story from the Predator's point of view, such as its humiliation of having its mask removed by Harrigan and its reasoning for not killing Cantrell due to its discovery of her pregnancy.

Video games
The film was adapted twice as a video game; the first for computer in 1990 and the second for Sega Genesis in 1992.

Notes

References

External links

 
 
 

1990 films
1990s science fiction horror films
American sequel films
American action horror films
American science fiction action films
American science fiction horror films
1990s English-language films
Fictional portrayals of the Los Angeles Police Department
Films about Colombian drug cartels
Films set in 1997
Films set in Los Angeles
Films set in the future
Films shot in California
American police detective films
Predator (franchise) films
20th Century Fox films
Davis Entertainment films
Silver Pictures films
Films directed by Stephen Hopkins
Films produced by Lawrence Gordon
Films produced by Joel Silver
Films produced by John Davis
Films scored by Alan Silvestri
Films about extraterrestrial life
Films with screenplays by Jim Thomas (screenwriter)
Films with screenplays by John Thomas (screenwriter)
1990s American films